Yasin Sülün (born December 17, 1977 in İstanbul, Turkey) is a Turkish football coach and a former player. During his playing career, Sülün played professionally at Beşiktaş J.K., Diyarbakırspor, Bursaspor, Altay S.K., Kasımpaşa S.K., Kocaelispor, Adana Demirspor and Sarıyer S.K.

Career
Yasin Sülün started his career at Beşiktaş J.K. where he played for 15 years, including his youth tenure. Promoted to the senior team by Welsh manager John Toschack, Sülün made his professional debut against Kocaelispor on 11 April 1998, which Beşiktaş lost with 3–2 final score.

He represented Turkey 10 times at U-21 level between 1998 and 2000.

References

External links 
 Profile at TFF.org

1977 births
Living people
Turkish footballers
Turkey under-21 international footballers
Adana Demirspor footballers
Beşiktaş J.K. footballers
Bursaspor footballers
Diyarbakırspor footballers
Altay S.K. footballers
Kasımpaşa S.K. footballers
Kocaelispor footballers
Süper Lig players
Association football defenders